Axonometry is a graphical procedure belonging to descriptive geometry that generates a planar image of a three-dimensional object. The term "axonometry" means "to measure along axes", and indicates that the dimensions and scaling of the coordinate axes play a crucial role. The result of an axonometric procedure is a uniformly-scaled parallel projection of the object. In general, the resulting parallel projection is oblique (the rays are not perpendicular to the image plane); but in special cases the result is orthographic (the rays are perpendicular to the image plane), which in this context is called an orthogonal axonometry.

In technical drawing and in architecture, axonometric perspective is a form of two-dimensional representation of three-dimensional objects whose goal is to preserve the impression of volume or relief. Sometimes also called rapid perspective or artificial perspective, it differs from conical perspective and does not represent what the eye actually sees: in particular parallel lines remain parallel and distant objects are not reduced in size. It can be considered a conical perspective conique whose center has been pushed out to infinity, i.e. very far from the object observed.

The term axonometry is used both for the graphical procedure described below, as well as the image produced by this procedure.
 
Axonometry should not be confused with axonometric projection, which in English literature usually refers to orthogonal axonometry.

Principle of axonometry 

Pohlke's theorem is the basis for the following procedure to construct a scaled parallel projection of a three-dimensional object:

 Select projections of the coordinate axes, such that all three coordinate axes are not collapsed to a single point or line. Usually the z-axis is vertical.
 The projection  of a point  is determined in three sub-steps (the result is independent of the order of these sub-steps):
 Mark the final position as point .

In order to obtain undistorted results, select the projections of the axes and foreshortenings carefully (see below). In order to produce an orthographic projection, only the projections of the coordinate axes are freely selected; the foreshortenings are fixed (see :de:orthogonale Axonometrie).

The choice of the images of the axes and the foreshortenings 

Notation:
  angle between -axis and -axis
  angle between -axis and  -axis
  angle between -axis and -axis.

The angles can be chosen so that 
The foreshortenings: 

Only for suitable choices of angles and foreshortenings does one get undistorted images. The next diagram shows the images of the unit cube for various angles and foreshortenings and gives some hints for how to make these personal choices.

 

If two foreshortenings are equal, the projection is called dimetric.
If the three foreshortenings are equal, the projection is called isometric.
If all foreshortenings are different, the projection is called trimetric.

The parameters in the diagram at right (e.g. of the house drawn on graph paper) are:  Hence it is a dimetric axonometry. The image plane is parallel to the y-z-plane and any planar figure parallel to the y-z-plane appears in its true shape.

Special axonometries

Engineer projection 
In this case 
 the foreshortenings are:  (dimetric axonometry) and
 the angles between the axes are: 
These angles are marked on many German set squares.

Advantages of an engineer projection: 
 simple foreshortenings, 
 a uniformly scaled orthographic projection with scaling factor 1.06, 
 the contour of a sphere is a circle (in general, an ellipse) .
For more details: see :de:Axonometrie.

Cavalier perspective, cabinet perspective 
 image plane parallel to y-z-plane.
In the literature the terms "cavalier perspective" and "cabinet perspective" are not uniformly defined. The above definition is the most general one. Often, further restrictions are applied. For example: 

Birds eye view, military projection 
 image plane parallel to x-y-plane. 
military projection: additionally choose  (isometric).
Such axonometries are often used for city maps, in order to keep horizontal figures undistorted.

Isometric axonometry 

(Not to be confused with an isometry between metric spaces.)

For an isometric axonometry all foreshortenings are equal.

For the standard isometry or just isometry one chooses:
  (all axes undistorted) 
 

The advantage of a standard isometry: 
 the coordinates can be taken unchanged, 
 the image is a scaled orthographic projection with scale factor . Hence the image has a good impression and the contour of a sphere is a circle.  
 Some computer graphic systems (for example, xfig) provide a suitable raster (see diagram) as support.
In order to prevent scaling, one can choose the unhandy foreshortenings
  (instead of 1)
and the image is an (unscaled) orthographic projection.

Circles in axonometry 
A parallel projection of a circle is in general an ellipse. An important special case occurs, if the circle's plane is parallel to the image plane–the image of the circle is then a congruent circle. In the diagram, the circle contained in the front face is undistorted. If the image of a circle is an ellipse, one can map four points on orthogonal diameters and the surrounding square of tangents and in the image parallelogram fill-in an ellipse by hand. A better, but more time consuming method consists of drawing the images of two perpendicular diameters of the circle, which are conjugate diameters of the image ellipse, determining the axes of the ellipse with Rytz's construction and drawing the ellipse.

Spheres in axonometry 
In a general axonometry of a sphere the image contour is an ellipse. 
The contour of a sphere is a circle only in an orthogonal axonometry. But, as the engineer projection and the standard isometry are scaled orthographic projections, the contour of a sphere is a circle in these cases, as well. As the diagram shows, an ellipse as the contour of a sphere might be confusing, so, if a sphere is part of an object to be mapped, one should choose an orthogonal axonometry or an engineer projection or a standard isometry.

References 
 
 
 
 
 

Notes

External links 
Orthogonal axonometry

Graphical projections